Sania Iqbal Khan (born 23 March 1985) is a Pakistani former cricketer who played as a right-arm medium bowler and right-handed batter. She appeared in 17 One Day Internationals and 25 Twenty20 Internationals for Pakistan between 2009 and 2016, including playing two matches at the 2009 World Cup level. She also played at two World Twenty20s, and captained Pakistan in two WT20Is in 2010. She played domestic cricket for Multan, Karachi and Zarai Taraqiati Bank Limited.

References

External links
 
 

1985 births
Living people
Punjabi people
Cricketers from Multan
Pakistani women cricketers
Pakistani women cricket captains
Pakistan women One Day International cricketers
Pakistan women Twenty20 International cricketers
Multan women cricketers
Karachi women cricketers
Zarai Taraqiati Bank Limited women cricketers
Asian Games medalists in cricket
Cricketers at the 2010 Asian Games
Cricketers at the 2014 Asian Games
Asian Games gold medalists for Pakistan
Medalists at the 2010 Asian Games
Medalists at the 2014 Asian Games